SAE or Sae may refer to:

Science and technology

 Selective area epitaxy, local growth of epitaxial layer through a patterned dielectric mask deposited on a semiconductor substrate
 Serious adverse event, in a clinical trial
 Simultaneous Authentication of Equals, a password authentication protocol in computer networking
 Subcortical arteriosclerotic encephalopathy, a disease
 Sum of absolute errors, in mathematics
 Supervised agricultural experience
 System Architecture Evolution, the core network architecture of 3GPP's LTE wireless communication standard

Units and standards
 SAE, several units of measurement of power; See Horsepower
 SAE viscosity number, of motor oils
 SAE steel grades
 SAE fastener
 SAE thread
 United States customary units, e.g. inches and miles rather than millimeters and kilometers

Linguistics
 South African English, the first-language dialects of English spoken by South Africans
 Standard Average European, a sprachbund consisting of the major part of the Indo-European languages
 Standard American English (disambiguation), the standardized form of written American English
 Southern American English

Organizations
 SAE Institute (formerly the School of Audio Engineering), a private college founded in 1976
 SAE Online (formerly SAE Graduate college), distance learning programs run by SAE Institute
 SAE International (originally the Society of Automotive Engineers), a US-based, global professional association and standards developing organization for engineering professionals in various industries
 SAE – World Council of Hellenes Abroad, the main body representing people of Greek ethnic descent, the Greek Diaspora (Omogeneia) living outside the boundaries of the Greek state
 , the Brazilian Intelligence Agency
 Sigma Alpha Epsilon, a fraternity
 Society of Accountants in Edinburgh, founded in 1853, a predecessor of the Institute of Chartered Accountants of Scotland
 Soviet Antarctic Expedition, part of the Arctic and Antarctic Research Institute of the Soviet Committee on Antarctic Research of the Academy of Sciences of the USSR
 Stichting Academisch Erfgoed, a Dutch organization

Places
 Sae, Harju County, village in Kõue Parish, Harju County, Estonia
 Sae, Lääne-Viru County, village in Rägavere Parish, Lääne-Viru County, Estonia
 Shah Alam Expressway, an expressway in Klang Valley, Malaysia
 Sae Island, an island within the Western Islands of the Bismarck Archipelago, Papua New Guinea

Other uses
 Sae (given name), a feminine Japanese given name
 Société anonyme égyptienne ("Egyptian Anonymous Society"), Egyptian variant of S.A.
 Stamped addressed envelope

See also
 Sexual assault evidence collection kit (SAECK), in forensics